Riku may refer to:
 Riku, Hormozgan
 Riku, Babol, Mazandaran Province
 Riku, Savadkuh, Mazandaran Province

See also
 Rigu (disambiguation)